Dwayne Anthony De Rosario OOnt (born May 15, 1978) is a Canadian former professional soccer player, who played as a forward or as an attacking midfielder. De Rosario last played for the Mississauga MetroStars of the Major Arena Soccer League. A versatile attacker, he played for the Toronto Lynx, FSV Zwickau and Richmond Kickers early in his career. He came to prominence in the 2000s playing in Major League Soccer for the San Jose Earthquakes, Houston Dynamo, Toronto FC, New York Red Bulls and D.C. United. A four-time MLS Cup champion, he also won the 2011 MLS Most Valuable Player award. He is the ninth-leading scorer in MLS history with 104 goals. He is widely regarded as one of the greatest and most decorated Canadian players of all time. 

Internationally, De Rosario represented the Canadian national team from 1998 to 2015 where he was the country's all-time leading scorer, with 22 goals in 81 games. De Rosario is a 2000 CONCACAF Gold Cup champion and four-time Canadian Player of the Year. As part of the Canadian Soccer Association's 2012 centennial celebration, he was honoured on the all-time Canada XI men's team.

Club career

Early career 
Born in the Toronto suburb of Scarborough, Ontario, De Rosario is the son of Guyanese immigrants to Canada. He began playing soccer at age three with Scarborough Blizzard SC, later playing with the Malvern Majors. As a 14-year-old, De Rosario rejected an offer from A.C. Milan after a successful trial because he was not ready to commit to living in Italy.

De Rosario began his professional career in 1997 at the age of 18, signing with the Toronto Lynx of the A-League. Halfway through the season, however, De Rosario signed with German side FSV Zwickau. After two seasons with Zwickau, De Rosario returned to North America, signing with the Richmond Kickers in 1999. After a slow 1999 season, in which he registered two goals and five assists, De Rosario scored fifteen goals and provided five assists while leading the team to a 20–6–1 record in 2000.

San Jose Earthquakes 

The next season, when Canadian Frank Yallop was named head coach of the San Jose Earthquakes, De Rosario was one of his first acquisitions. De Rosario proved Yallop's judgment right, scoring five goals and four assists in only 1,072 minutes for the Earthquakes in 2001, playing an important role as the team went on to win the MLS Cup; he scored the golden goal in the final and was named MLS Cup MVP. De Rosario had similar success in 2002, registering four goals and eight assists in 1,637 minutes, though the Quakes fell short of a repeat. In 2003, a torn ACL hobbled De Rosario for much of the season but he still managed to make a late surge, registering four goals and three assists in only 686 minutes and helping lead the team to a second MLS Cup championship. De Rosario played 1,211 minutes in 2004, scoring five goals, including the 2004 MLS Goal of the Year, and three assists.

In December 2004 De Rosario had a trial with Nottingham Forest, but he was not offered a contract by the team.

In 2005, following Landon Donovan's departure, De Rosario moved to midfield and promptly led MLS in assists with 13, while scoring nine goals, including the 2005 MLS Goal of the Year – the only player ever to receive that honour in two consecutive years – for a powerful bending free kick in the last regular season game against the Los Angeles Galaxy. He was named to the MLS Best XI six times (2005–07, 2009–11).

Houston Dynamo 

Due to San Jose's failure to reach a stadium agreement with AEG, De Rosario, along with the rest of his Earthquakes teammates, moved to Houston for the 2006 season. During the 2006 MLS All-Star Game in Chicago, De Rosario scored the only goal of the game in the 70th minute to lift the MLS All Stars to a 1–0 win over Chelsea, a pre-season friendly for the London club. De Rosario was one of only four players on the MLS team to play the entire match.

De Rosario and the Houston Dynamo captured the 2006 MLS Cup title by beating the New England Revolution on November 12, 2006. The Dynamo won in a shootout, and De Rosario successfully converted his penalty kick. De Rosario signed a contract extension with Houston through 2010, where he was reported to make $325,000 per year. He was later transferred to Toronto before the end of his contract.

The next year, De Rosario assisted on Joseph Ngwenya's equalizing goal and scored the winning goal of the 2007 MLS Cup final, giving Houston a 2–1 win over the Revolution and the Dynamo their second championship. De Rosario was named MLS Cup MVP, the first player ever to win the award twice.

De Rosario made his third consecutive all-star appearance at the 2008 MLS All-Star Game in his home country, when the game was held in Toronto. He scored the decisive goal on a penalty kick in the 69th minute in the MLS All-Stars' 3–2 victory over West Ham United.

Toronto FC 

De Rosario was traded to Toronto FC on December 12, 2008, in return for Julius James and allocation money, after long speculation that De Rosario would move to his hometown club. He made his competitive debut for Toronto FC on Saturday, March 21 against the Kansas City Wizards, setting up Jim Brennan for Toronto's first goal in a 3–2 victory. He scored his first goal for Toronto from a header in a 1–1 draw at BMO Field against FC Dallas.

De Rosario was expected to miss the first two to four weeks of Toronto FC's training camp due to a calf injury obtained in the January 31, 2010, match against Jamaica, and returned to game action in Toronto's 1–0 preseason win versus the University of South Florida.

On April 8, 2010, De Rosario was named captain of Toronto FC, the second in the club's history, after the retirement of Jim Brennan. Two days later, De Rosario scored his first goal of the 2010 season, his team's first, in a 4–1 loss to the New England Revolution.

On April 15, 2010, De Rosario scored twice in Toronto's 2–1 home opener win against the Philadelphia Union. In his next game versus the Colorado Rapids, De Rosario scored his fourth goal of the season, and more importantly, became Toronto FC's all-time leading scorer in the regular season. De Rosario again found the back of the net on April 25 in a 2–0 home win against Seattle Sounders FC, scoring the first goal, his fifth of the season. Until O'Brian White scored the second goal for Toronto, De Rosario had previously scored all of Toronto's goals up until that point in the season. For his efforts in that game, he was awarded the MLS Player of the Week for week 5. De Rosario was again honoured with the Player of the Week award on week 10 of the MLS season, for his two-goal performance against his former team the San Jose Earthquakes. De Rosario had scored the second and third goal in Toronto FC's 3–1 win.

De Rosario continued to have a successful 2010 season for Toronto, culminating in a spot on the MLS All-Star team, scoring a goal in the 5–2 loss to Manchester United.

On August 3, 2010, De Rosario scored against C.D. Motagua in the second leg of Toronto FC's CONCACAF Champions League preliminary round tie, which at the time, put TFC ahead on 2–1 on aggregate. They would eventually win 3–2 on aggregate.

On December 28, De Rosario was confirmed to be on trial with Scottish Premier League club Celtic by manager Neil Lennon. Dwayne and Celtic inquired about the possibility of a short-term loan deal until the MLS season kicked off in March, however new Toronto FC coach Aron Winter and the league denied any further negotiations.

De Rosario scored the first Toronto goal of the 2011 season on March 19 in a 4–2 away defeat to Vancouver Whitecaps FC in what was the league's first all Canadian match up. The goal scored in the 20th minute was also the 8000th goal scored in Major League Soccer's history.

New York Red Bulls 
New York Red Bulls acquired De Rosario on April 1, 2011, in exchange for midfielder Tony Tchani, defender Danleigh Borman and a first round 2012 MLS SuperDraft pick. He scored his first goal for New York on a penalty, as the second goal, in a 3–2 loss to Chivas USA.

D.C. United 

D.C. United acquired De Rosario on June 27, 2011, in exchange for midfielder Dax McCarty. He scored his first goal for the club against his former club New York Red Bulls on his return to Red Bull Arena. On July 30, 2011, his double gave United a 2–0 victory over former club, San Jose. On August 6, 2011, he led United to a 3–3 draw against Toronto F.C. with his hat-trick.
All three goals were scored while United played with ten men following an early ejection of goalkeeper Bill Hamid. His second hat-trick was recorded on September 25, 2011, as he recorded all three goals in the span of 9 minutes, setting another MLS record. De Rosario completed the season with a total of 16 goals and 12 assists over 32 games. Of those, 13 goals and 7 assists were made during his 17 games with United.

On August 29, 2012, De Rosario scored his 100th MLS goal, in a 2–2 home draw against the Red Bulls. He was the seventh player to reach the milestone.

Return to Toronto FC 
After having his option declined by D.C. United, De Rosario returned to Toronto FC on December 18, 2013, after being chosen in the 2013 MLS Re-Entry Draft. He officially signed with the club on January 9, 2014. It was announced on December 3, 2014, that Toronto had declined the option to renew De Rosario's contract.

Brief retirement 
De Rosario announced his retirement on May 10, 2015, and that he would be taking an ambassador role with Maple Leaf Sports & Entertainment.

Mississauga MetroStars
In October 2018 De Rosario came out of retirement to sign with the newly formed MASL club, the Mississauga MetroStars; he later scored his first goal for the club in the MetroStars's opening match, an 11–3 loss away to the Baltimore Blast.

International career 

De Rosario represented the Canadian U-20 team at the 1997 FIFA World Youth Championship, and the Canadian U-23 team at the 1999 Pan American Games in Winnipeg. He received his first senior cap for Canada on May 18, 1998, against FYR Macedonia at the age of 20. He won the 2000 CONCACAF Gold Cup with Canada and represented them as well at the 2001 FIFA Confederations Cup.

In 2007, De Rosario won the male Canadian Player of the Year award making it three consecutive years receiving the honour. In 2007, he scored five goals in eight games, the most in a year for the CMNT since John Catliff in 1993.

De Rosario was picked for his first CONCACAF Gold Cup in four years, after being selected by coach Stephen Hart in late May 2011 for the 23-man tournament roster. After a disappointing, 2–0 defeat to United States in the opening game of the group Canada failed to exit the group with a 1–1–1 record, they only managed to score two goals both from De Rosario at the penalty spot. De Rosario continued his goal scoring for with two goals in the opening stage of 2014 FIFA World Cup qualification, one came against Saint Lucia in early September and the other against Saint Kitts and Nevis in mid November. His goal against Saint Kitts, was his 19th international goal which tied him as Canadian all-time top goal scorer with Dale Mitchell. On December 14, De Rosario was awarded 2011 Canadian Player of the Year receiving 47.7% of the vote, Simeon Jackson in second and Josh Simpson finishing in third. This was the fourth time De Rosario was honoured with the award. On September 7, 2012, De Rosario scored his 20th goal for Canada in a 2014 FIFA World Cup qualification match against Panama, making him the all-time leading goal scorer for Canada.

In De Rosario's final appearance for Canada, he scored a goal in a 1–1 draw with Iceland on January 19, 2015.

De Rosario was the country's all-time leading male goalscorer, with 22 international goals in 81 matches, until Cyle Larin surpassed his record in 2022.

Personal life 
De Rosario adopted a strict vegan diet in 1994, but started eating fish ten years later. He is married to Brandy De Rosario and has four children, including his sons Osaze and Adisa, who are also professional soccer players. His cousin is Olympic hurdler Priscilla Lopes-Schliep. He was appointed to the Order of Ontario in February 2020. His autobiography 'DeRo: My Life', written with Brendan Dunlop was published in May 2021 by ECW Press.

DeRo United Futbol Academy
In 2012, De Rosario established the DeRo United Futbol Academy. They entered a team in the League1 Ontario women's division beginning in 2018. In June 2021, the club became an official affiliate team of De Rosario's former club Toronto FC, joining their academy system and re-branded as DeRo TFC.

Career statistics

Club

1.Includes Canadian Championship, DFB-Pokal, and U.S. Open Cup.
2.Includes CONCACAF Champions' Cup and CONCACAF Champions League.
3.Includes MLS Cup Playoffs and North American SuperLiga.

International

International goals 
Scores and results list Canada's goal tally first, score column indicates score after each De Rosario goal.

Honours

Club 
San Jose Earthquakes
MLS Cup: 2001, 2003
Supporters' Shield: 2005

Houston Dynamo
MLS Cup: 2006, 2007

Toronto FC
Canadian Championship: 2009, 2010

D.C. United
U.S. Open Cup: 2013

International 
Canada
CONCACAF Gold Cup: 2000

Individual 
MLS MVP Award: 2011
MLS All-Star: 2006, 2007, 2008, 2009, 2010, 2011, 2012
MLS Best XI: 2005, 2006, 2007, 2009, 2010, 2011
MLS Golden Boot: 2011
MLS Goal of the Year Award: 2004, 2005
George Gross Memorial Trophy: 2009, 2010
Canadian Players of the Year: 2005, 2006, 2007, 2011
Red Patch Boys Player of the Year: 2009
Major League Soccer 25 Greatest Players
Ontario Sports Hall of Fame inductee, 2019
The Order of Ontario appointee, 2020

References

External links 

 
 
 

1978 births
Living people
Canadian sportspeople of Guyanese descent
Sportspeople from Scarborough, Toronto
Soccer players from Toronto
Canadian soccer players
Association football midfielders
Association football forwards
Toronto Lynx players
FSV Zwickau players
Richmond Kickers players
San Jose Earthquakes players
Houston Dynamo FC players
Toronto FC players
New York Red Bulls players
D.C. United players
Mississauga MetroStars players
A-League (1995–2004) players
2. Bundesliga players
Major League Soccer players
Major League Soccer All-Stars
Designated Players (MLS)
Major Arena Soccer League players
Pan American Games competitors for Canada
Footballers at the 1999 Pan American Games
Canada men's youth international soccer players
Canada men's under-23 international soccer players
Canada men's international soccer players
2000 CONCACAF Gold Cup players
2001 FIFA Confederations Cup players
2002 CONCACAF Gold Cup players
2005 CONCACAF Gold Cup players
2007 CONCACAF Gold Cup players
2011 CONCACAF Gold Cup players
CONCACAF Gold Cup-winning players
Canadian expatriate soccer players
Canadian expatriate sportspeople in Germany
Canadian expatriate sportspeople in the United States
Expatriate footballers in Germany
Expatriate soccer players in the United States
Members of the Order of Ontario